The Girls' 3000 metres at the 2013 World Youth Championships in Athletics was held on 10 July.

Medalists

Records
Prior to the competition, the following records were as follows.

Final

References

2013 World Youth Championships in Athletics